The 1964 Richmond Spiders football team was an American football team that represented the University of Richmond as a member of the Southern Conference (SoCon) during the 1964 NCAA University Division football season. In their fourteenth season under head coach Ed Merrick, Richmond compiled a 3–7 record, with a mark of 2–4 in conference play, finishing in sixth place in the SoCon.

Schedule

References

Richmond
Richmond Spiders football seasons
Richmond Spiders football